JW Marriott Kuwait City is a luxury hotel in Kuwait City, Kuwait. Formerly Le Méridien Kuwait, the hotel's management was transferred to Marriott International in November 2002, and it was rebranded as a JW Marriott on January 1, 2003. The hotel has 313 rooms, including seventy-four suites.

The hotel is part of a mixed-use development including the high-end Salhia Complex shopping mall, offices above the mall and the Sahab Tower office building, and is the flagship development of owners Salhia Real Estate Company.

History

In 1978, the Salhia Real Estate Company began construction on a mixed-use project including a mall with attached hotel. Opened in 1980, Le Méridien Kuwait opened to international acclaim as one of the most luxurious hotels in the area, and as one of the first international-class hotels in Kuwait.

In 1990, the hotel's lobby and first floor were set on fire by invading Iraqi soldiers, and the interiors sustained damage. Following the Invasion, these impacted areas were restored and reconstructed to reopen to guests.

In 2003, the hotel served as a major hub for visiting journalists during the war in Iraq. Severe security measures were undertaken at the hotel, including the scanning of all incoming vehicles, passing through metal detectors, luggage scanning, identity tests, and the parking of vehicles several meters from the hotel's entrance and porte cochère.

Renovations

Since January 1, 2003 the hotel has embarked on several multi-million dollar renovation projects, which included the refurbishment of the hotel's lobby, restaurants, health facilities, and all guest rooms. Further changes involved the addition of a new logo on the building's exterior.

As of December 2020, the hotel has been closed for several months as a result of the COVID-19 pandemic and will undergo a comprehensive reconstruction that will see the adjacent mall expand into the hotel's current lobby area, and the first few floors of the hotel tower converted to offices. The hotel itself will remain, but will only occupy the upper floors of the tower and will emerge as a smaller property following completion of the project.

See also
JW Marriott Hotels

External links
 JW Marriott Kuwait City official website

JW Marriott Hotels
Hotels in Kuwait
Hotel buildings completed in 1980
Hotels established in 1980